Edward Burgh or Borough may refer to:

Edward Burgh (baron) (died 1528), English peer
Edward Burgh (knight) (died 1533), 1st husband of Queen Catherine Parr
Edward Borough of the Borough baronets

See also
Burgh (disambiguation)